The Roraiman nightjar (Setopagis whitelyi) is a species of nightjar in the family Caprimulgidae. It is found in Brazil, Guyana, and Venezuela.

Taxonomy and systematics

The Roraiman nightjar was described as Anstrotomus whitelyi and was later lumped into genus Caprimulgus. Since the early 2010s has been placed in its current genus Setopagis. It is monotypic.

Description

Males weigh  and females . The male's upperparts are blackish brown with cinnamon and grayish spots. The tail feathers are dark brown; the outermost three pairs have faint but broad pale buff bars and two pairs have large white spots at their tips. The wings are mostly dark brown with a thin white bar near the end and white spots near the body. The chin and upper throat are dark brown, the lower throat white, the breast dark brown with pale buff bars, and the belly and flanks pale buff with brown bars. The female is more brownish than blackish, the wing spots and bars are smaller and buffy instead of white, and the white spots on the tail are smaller.

Distribution and habitat

The Roraiman nightjar is found in the tepui region at the junction of southeastern Venezuela, southwestern Guyana, and northernmost Brazil. It inhabits open areas such as savanna, clearings, and the edges of forest.

Behavior

Feeding

The Roraiman nightjar is nocturnal. Little is known about its foraging behavior, whether it forages by sallying from the ground or a low perch and/or during continuous flight.

Breeding

The Roraiman nightjar's breeding phenology is unknown. It is assumed to lay one or two eggs directly on the ground like other nightjars.

Vocalization

The Roraiman nightjar's song is "a burry hreeer, rising then falling in pitch, and repeated at intervals of 1-2 seconds."

Status

The IUCN has assessed the Roraiman nightjar as being of Least Concern. Though its population is unknown it is believed to be stable. The primary threat is habitat modification; the tepui vegetation when damaged does not regrow but is replaced by vegetation less suitable for the nightjar.

References

Roraiman nightjar
Birds of Venezuela
Roraiman nightjar
Roraiman nightjar
Taxonomy articles created by Polbot
Birds of the Tepuis